Justice Gorman may refer to:

Ellen Gorman (born 1955), associate justice of the Maine Supreme Judicial Court
Robert N. Gorman (1896–1962), associate justice of the Ohio Supreme Court
Sir William Gorman (politician) (1891–1964), British judge and politician